Aai Majhi Kalubai is an Indian Marathi television series which premiered on 14 September 2020 on Sony Marathi. It is produced by Kasturisha Arts of Alka Kubal and Sameer Athlye. It stars Alka Kubal, Rashmi Anpat and Vivek Sangle. It aired from 14 September 2020 to 15 August 2021. It was replaced by Vaidehi -Shatjanmanche Apule Naate.

Cast

Main 
 Alka Kubal as Goddess Kalubai. (2020–2021)
 as Gaura Maushi/Politician, Goddess Kalubai's human form. (2020-2021)
 Prajakta Gaikwad as Aarya Amogh Patil (nee Purohit): Amogh's wife, Madhavrao and Shalini's daughter-in-law, Purohit's daughter, Sanket's sister, Kalubai's devotee. Her mission is to defeat Virat's wrongdoings and re-establish Goddess Kalubai's devotion in Patil's Mansion and the whole village. (September 2020 – November 2020)
 Veena Jagtap replaced Gaikwad as Aarya. (November 2020 – March 2021)
 Rashmi Anpat replaced Jagtap as Arya. (March 2021 – August 2020)
 Vivek Sangle as Amogh Raje Patil, Madhavrao and Shalini's son, Milind's cousin, Hamberao Patil's grandson. He is a lawyer by profession. He is an atheist and believes neither Goddess Kalubai nor Virat Guruji. (2020–2021)

Recurring 
 Amogh's family
 Ashalata Wabgaonkar as Vasundhara Hamberao Patil: Hamberao Patil's wife, Surendra Raje and Madhavrao Raje's mother, Amogh and Milind's grandmother, Shalini, Susheela's mother-in-law, Aarya and Malati's grandmother-in-law, Goddess Kalubai's devotee. Along with Susheela, she helps Aarya to re-establish Goddess Kalubai in Patil Mansion. (September 2020)
 Shakuntala Nare replaced Ashalata due to her death. (October–November 2020)
 Smita Oak replaced Shakuntala due to her health issues. (November 2020 – 2021)
 Prasanna Ketkar as Madhavrao Raje Patil: Vasundhara & Hamberao Patil's older son, Surendra Raje's brother, Shalini's husband, Amogh's father, Aarya's father-in-law. He was provoked by Virat Guruji against Goddess Kalubai. He was involved in killing Aarya's grandfather in the past. (2020-2021)
 Manjusha Godse as Shalini Madhavrao Patil: Vasundhara & Hamberao Patil's daughter-in-law, Amogh's mother, Aarya's mother-in-law. She follows Virat Guruji's orders against Aarya and Goddess Kalubai. (2020-2021)
 Sangram Salvi as Milind Raje Patil: Surendra's son, Hamberao and Vasundhara's grandson, Virat's devotee. He believes in Virat Guruji and decides to demolish Aarya's plan against them. When killing Aarya, he himself gets electrocuted and dies. (2020–2021)
 Janhavi Killekar as Malti Milind Patil: Milind's Wife. Along with Milind, she plans to get the family property. She hates Amogh and Aarya due to their kind-heartedness and decided to take her revenge against them after Milind's death. She eventually turns kind and tries to save Patils with Aarya against Virat's evil plans and also becomes devotee of Goddess Kalubai. (2020–2021)
 Ketaki Patil as Susheela Patil: Vasundhara & Hamberao Patil's daughter-in-law, Goddess Kalubai's devotee.
 Aniket Kelkar as Surendra Raje Patil: Vasundhara & Hamberao Patil's younger son, Madhavrao Raje's brother, Milind's father, Malati's father-in-law. He is a local politician. He along with Malati plan to takeover Patil Mansion. (2020-2021)

 Aarya's family
 Sharad Ponkshe as Purohit: Aarya and Sanket's father. He is a devotee of Goddess Kalubai. He escaped Mavalkhed when his father was attacked by Patils and Virat at a young age. (2020-2021)
 Prajakta Dighe as Anita Purohit: Aarya and Sanket's mother. She is a devotee of Goddess Kalubai. (2020-2021)
 Leena Athavale-Datar as Manda Aatya: Purohit's sister, Aarya, and Sanket's aunt, Goddess Kalubai's devotee. (2020-2021)
 Parth Ketkar as  Sanket Purohit: Aarya's brother. He is also a devotee of Goddess Kalubai and was in Milind's captivity when he learned about his wrongdoings and crime, although he managed to escape later on. (2020-2021)

 Others
 Milind Shinde as Virat Guruji: The evil successor of Lakhyasura. He misguided the Patil family against Goddess Kalubai. His goal is to achieve the highest level of power in the village and end the existence of Goddess Kalubai. (2020-2021)
 Shilpa Thakre as Sai: Amogh's ex-fiancee. Virat Guruji's student. (2020)
 Rujuta Dharap replaced Shilpa as Sai. (2020-2021)

Production

Development
The show was produced by Alka Kubal Athlye and Sameer Athlye of Kasturisha Arts Production House. The pre-production started in March 2020 and show was about to air from April 2020. Due to the COVID-19 pandemic, the production of the series stopped. After three and half month, the production of the series began in July 2020 and the show was launched on 14 September 2020.

Filming 
The show was about to shoot in Thane in March 2020. But due to the COVID-19 pandemic, the production house decided to make Satara, Maharashtra as their production base.
On 13 April, Chief Minister of Maharashtra, Uddhav Thackeray announced sudden curfew due to increased COVID-19 cases, while the production halted from 14 April 2021. Hence, the production location was soon shifted temporarily to Goa. Soon in May 2021, the shooting locations were shifted once again to Silvassa, where the story focused on Aarya's pregnancy and Virat's evil plotting against Patils. Later again in June 2021, it returned to its original location in Satara, Maharashtra.

Casting 
Prajakta Gaikwad was cast as main lead Aarya Purohit, Goddess Kalubai's devotee. Vivek Sangle was cast opposite her as her husband, Amogh. Alka Kubal reprised the titular role of Goddess Kalubai. Milind Shinde was cast as Evil Virat Guruji, the main antagonist. Later Rujuta Dharap entered as the second main antagonist. Ashalata Wabgaonkar, Manjusha Godse, Prasanna Ketkar, Sharad Ponkshe, Janhavi Killekar, Sangram Salvi were cast in pivotal roles.

When 22 cast and crew members were tested positive for COVID-19 in the launch week of the show, Ashalata Wabgaonkar also tested positive and passed away in late-September 2020. Later, Shakuntala Nare was roped in as Vasundhara Aaji in early October 2020. But due to her health issues, she quit the show and later Smita Oak replaced her in the show. In late October 2020, lead actress Prajakta Gaikwad quit the series. Soon in November 2020, Veena Jagtap stepped into the role of Aarya and was well received by the audience. In late March 2021, Veena Jagtap quit the series due to her deteriorating health and was eventually replaced by Rashmi Anpat as Aarya. Sangram Salvi playing Milind and Janhavi Killekar playing Malti quit the series in April 2021 and June 2021 respectively due to end of their character.

References 

Sony Marathi original programming
Marathi-language television shows
2020 Indian television series debuts
2021 Indian television series endings